Pyeonghae Hwang clan is one of the Korean clans. Their Bon-gwan is in Pyeonghae-eup, Uljin County, North Gyeongsang Province. According to the research from 2015, the number of Pyeonghae Hwang clan members was 168,374. Hwang Rak, a minister in Han dynasty, began the Hwang clan in Korea. When Hwang Rak was dispatched as an envoy in 28 B.C. during Emperor Guangwu of Han's reign, he was cast ashore on his way to Vietnam and was naturalized in Silla. As a result, a descendant of Hwang Rak, became a Pyeonghae Hwang clan's founder.

Notable clan members
 Hwang Kyung-seon
 Hwang Pyong-so
 Sang-Min Whang
 Hwang Sun-hong
 Hwang Young-cho

See also 
 Korean clan names of foreign origin

References

External links 
 

 
Korean clan names of Chinese origin
Hwang clans